Manikarnika: The Queen of Jhansi is a 2019 Indian Hindi-language historical action drama film based on the life of Rani Lakshmi Bai of Jhansi. It is directed by Krish Jagarlamudi and Kangana Ranaut from a screenplay written by V. Vijayendra Prasad. Produced by Zee Studios, the film stars Ranaut in the title role.

Manikarnika: The Queen of Jhansi was released on 3700 screens in 50 countries worldwide on 25 January 2019. The film performed well internationally and in India in its theatrical run. The film broke the record of highest single-day earner for a female-driven film in India previously held by Ranaut's own Tanu Weds Manu: Returns. and the highest first weekend collections for a female driven film in India. The film also became the highest Indian opener in Japan in January 2020. It is one of the highest grossing women centric films in India.

The film opened to positive critical response. It was selected for the Bucheon International Fantastic Film Festival. Ranaut's portrayal of Rani Lakshmi Bai garnered widespread critical acclaim winning her the National Film Award for Best Actress at the 67th National Film Awards.

Plot 
In 1828, Manikarnika is born in the ghats of Varanasi. She is raised by her father, Moropanth and Peshwa Bajirao II in Bithoor. She is a favourite of the Peshwa and he has brought her up with lot of love. One day Dixit Ji of Jhansi spots her facing a ferocious tiger fearlessly. Impressed, he asks Peshwa for her hand in marriage with Maharaja of the Maratha ruled princely state of Jhansi, Gangadhar Rao. Dixit Ji is aware that the British is eyeing Jhansi and wants to annexe the kingdom at any cost. He realises that her brave persona would play a crucial role in giving a tough fight to the British. The marriage takes place and as per the tradition the king gives her a new name – ‘Laxmibai’ (or Lakshmi Bai). All these developments upset Gangadhar's brother Sadashiv Rao. He is friendly with the British and wants to usurp the throne by hook or by crook. Laxmibai, after a few years, gives birth to Damodar and she is unable to contain her happiness. Her joy however is short-lived as Sadashiv surreptitiously poisons Damodar. Gangadhar, at the same time, falls ill too. Knowing that his death is near, he and Laxmibai decide to adopt a son who will rule Jhansi in future. Much to Sadashiv's dismay, his son is not adopted and instead, ‘Anand Rao’ , the son of a courtier, is named the heir. He was renamed as Laxmibai instinctively calls him Damodar Rao. Gangadhar passes away and the British attempt to annexe the throne. However, Laxmibai surprises everyone as she decides to take over the reins. She proclaims herself as the queen of Jhansi and challenges the British openly. When the British force her to vacate the palace, she walks gracefully into the village and is welcomed and greeted by a massive parade of villagers led by Jhalkaribai. She continues to live among the civilians quietly strategizing to reclaim the throne.

The rebellions from the Indian Rebellion of 1857 reaches Jhansi where the revolutionaries led by Sangram Singh kills General Gordon and his officers; They further attempt to kill their children and wife but their attempts are thwarted by Laxmibai. She plans to conquer the throne of Jhansi back while Sangram Singh and his men join the rebellion in Delhi. The East India Company requests the British government to appoint Sir Hugh Rose to salvage the situation and remove Laxmibai from the throne permanently. Knowing very well that she will soon be attacked again, Laxmibai begins training her own army and especially women to fight. Laxmibai assembles a army of 20,000 troops and Pathans join her later in 1858. During the siege of Jhansi, Laxmibai valiantly steps into the battlefield to destroy the British cannons strategically placed in front of a temple. The strong fort walls keep Laxmibai and her army steady until Sadashiv Rao divulges secrets about the fort to the British who finally break the siege and manage to storm the keep, resulting in the death of ‘Gaus-Baba’. Jhalkaribai despite discovering that she is pregnant acts as a decoy pretending to be the queen due to her striking resemblance to Laxmibai. She manages distract the British army so that Laxmibai along with Damodar could escape the castle safely. Jhalkaribai sacrifices herself in a major gunpowder explosion killing numerous British officers along with her. Laxmibai escapes to Kalpi to reunite with Tatya Tope and other allies. She captures the princely state of Gwalior and motivates the troops to participate in the war. With a heavy heart, Laxmibai leaves Damodar and leads an attack on the British. Laxmibai bravely sets out to attack the huge British army but then faces a certain defeat. Laxmibai gets shot by one of the British soldiers, while taking her last breath she looks at Hugh Rose and immolates herself in a fire  to avoid being captured and humiliated by the British. After Laxmibai's death, Jhansi is surrendered to the British Government in 1860 on behalf of Damodar Rao. Damodar Rao although survived, but lived a life suffering from prolonged illness and dire poverty, dying at the age of 58 in 1903. General Hugh Rose wrote about Rani Laxmibai's bravery and courage in his autobiography that ‘‘She was the most dangerous of all rebel leaders, best and bravest of all, the only man among mutineers’’.

Cast 

 Kangana Ranaut as Rani Lakshmi Bai (Manikarnika "Manu")
 Jisshu Sengupta as Gangadhar Rao, Laxmibai's husband
 Atul Kulkarni as Tatya Tope
 Mohammed Zeeshan Ayyub as Sadashiv, Lakshmibai's brother-in-law
 Richard Keep as General Hugh Rose
 Suresh Oberoi as Bajirao II
 Danny Denzongpa as Ghulam Ghaus Khan
 Anil George as Pir Ali
 Edward Sonnenblick as Captain Gordon
 Vaibhav Tatwawaadi as Puran Singh
 Ankita Lokhande as Jhalkari Bai
 Yash Tonk as Rao Tula Ram
 R. Bhakti Klein as Lord Canning
 Katelyn Rodrigues as Little Manikarnika
 Mishti as KashiBai
 Priya Gamre as Sundar
 Unnati Davara as Mundar
 Suparna Marwah as Rajamata
 Ravi Prakash as Scindia King of Gwalior
 Ravi Pandey (actor) as Bakshish Ali
 Rajiv Kachroo as Gul Mohamad
 Nihar Pandya as Rao Saheb Peshwa
 Taher Shabbir as Sangram Singh (as Tahir Mithaiwala)
 Kulbhushan Kharbanda as Dixit Ji
 Manish Wadhwa as Moropant
 Nalneesh Neel as Teer Singh

Production 
The outdoor locations of the film were Jaipur, Jodhpur, Alsisar (Jhunjhunu) & Bikaner in Rajasthan and Narmada Ghat, Ahilya Fort in Madhya Pradesh. Besides these, the film was shot at studios in Hyderabad & Mumbai.

Sukant Panigrahy, Sriram Iyengar and Sujeet Sawant are production designers of the film. Sujeet and Sriram have also done production designing for Bajirao Mastani.

Principal photography was completed in October 2018. By that time, only 10 days of filming work remained. Krish intended to do that minimal patch work and then move on to direct N. T. R.. However, Sonu Sood was replaced by Mohammed Zeeshan Ayyub, forcing the team to reshoot all of Sood's scenes. As Krish was busy directing N. T. R., Ranaut took over, making her directorial debut. Both Krish and Ranaut received directorial credit.

Soundtrack 

The film's soundtrack is composed by Shankar–Ehsaan–Loy and lyrics written by Prasoon Joshi. The film's score was composed by Sanchit Balhara and Ankit Balhara.

Hindi Track listing

Tamil Track listing

Telugu Track listing

Marketing 
The first poster was released on 15 August 2018. Theatrical posters of the film were released in 2 languages for simultaneous release of the film in Tamil and Telugu with Hindi version on 4 January 2019.

Its official music launch took place on 9 January. The video song from Manikarnika: The Queen of Jhansi titled "Vijayi Bhava" was made available for public viewing on the same day. Short video teasers of dialogues and prominent scenes of the film were posted on facebook page of Zee Studios for viewers.

Release 
The film is certified U/A (Parental Guidance for children below the age of 12 years) by CBFC of India and the film was released on 25 January 2019. Its runtime is 148 minutes. Manikarnika: The Queen of Jhansi was released on 3700 screens in 50 countries worldwide in Hindi, Tamil and Telugu on 25 January 2019. While the original was in Hindi, the Tamil and the Telugu versions were dubbed from the Hindi version.

A special screening of the film was organised by Zee Entertainment for Ram Nath Kovind, the President of India, at Rashtrapati Bhavan Cultural Centre on 18 January in presence of Kangana Ranaut and her team before release of the film on 25 January 2019. After watching the film. the President felicitated the cast and crew of the film.

The film was selected for the Bucheon International Fantastic Film Festival. The film was also screened at the Kashi Indian International Film Festival, Itanagar International Film Festival, and at the Indian embassy, Lebanon under Azadi Ka Amrit Mahotsav event.

Critical reception 
Manikarnika: The Queen of Jhansi received generally positive reviews from the film critics, who noted the film to be too long but Ranaut's performance received widespread critical acclaim. On the Indian film review aggregator website The Review Monk, the film received an average score of 6/10 based on 28 reviews and 70% critics being in the favor.

India 
Anupama Chopra of Film Companion gave the film a rating of 3/5 and stated, ‘‘Manikarnika reveals Kangana as an artist with boundless ambition’’. Calling Ranaut's performance in the film ‘‘fiery’’ she wrote, ‘‘Kangana Ranaut is on fire as the iconic Rani Lakshmi Bai. Her spine is erect, her eyes are unblinking and she seems propelled by some other-worldly power. She’s riding horses, wielding swords, leaping on elephants and making it all look plausible. When she looks into camera and insists on dying for the country, you want to follow her into battle’’. Rajeev Masand of CNN-IBN gave the film a rating of 3/5 and wrote, ‘‘This is a deliberately simplistic film; an old-fashioned patriotic saga told in the broadest of strokes, and with full nationalist fervor’’. Praising Ranaut's performance he further wrote, ‘‘Kangana Ranaut’s extraordinary performance is the film’s biggest strength. She is unwavering in her portrayal of Rani Lakshmibai; There’s a hard-to-miss intensity in her eyes, and tenacity in her voice. She commands the screen with a fiery, arresting presence, never letting your attention wander away from her’’. Namrata Joshi of The Hindu wrote, ‘‘Ranaut doesn’t just share the director’s credit; she overshadows all of the cast, including veterans like Danny Denzongpa and consummate performers like Atul Kulkarni and Mohd Zeeshan Ayub. It’s evident that Ranaut has put her all into the film and she's present in practically every frame’’. Raja Sen of Hindustan Times gave the film a rating of 3/5 and wrote, ‘‘Kangana Ranaut’s film is an arrow against cinema’s patriarchy, a broadside against the boys’’. He called Ranaut a ‘‘one-woman army’’ and praised her performance by writing,
‘‘Ranaut is glorious and she makes you believe it. She wears a dazzling smile like a cloak of confidence, and slices down enemy soldiers with a fury. We know what this actress is capable of, and she gives even the weaker written parts of this film her all’’.

Shibaji Roychoudhury of Times Now gave the film a rating of 4/5 and wrote, ‘‘Manikarnika has many moments of genius and enough fire to keep you glued to the screen. Kangana’s performance as the iconic Rani of Jhansi is worth every penny spent’’. Praising Ranaut's performance he further wrote, ‘‘Kangana Ranaut’s portrayal of one of the most iconic women in Indian history is certainly praise-worthy. Her nuanced grasp of the rebel warrior-queen will certainly win you over’’. Meena Iyer of DNA gave the film a rating of 4/5 and wrote, ‘‘Kangana, who wears two hats that of the protagonist and the co-director displays a certain maturity on both counts. As a queen, she displays steely resolve, managing to infuse life into her Laxmibai; As a director, she shares credit with Krish and has assuredly contributed to this big-ticket outing’’. A. Ganesh Nadar of Rediff gave the film a rating of 4/5 and wrote, ‘‘The film is as grand as the Baahubali movies. Unsurprisingly, as both films have been written by the same writer, K. V. Vijayendra Prasad’’. Bollywood Hungama gave the film a rating of 3.5/5 and wrote, ‘‘Manikarnika – The Queen of Jhansi is a well-made historical with the right scale, emotional quotient and battle sequences as its highpoint. Also, Kangana Ranaut's performance is the icing on the cake’’. Praising Ranaut's performance they further wrote, ‘‘Kangana Ranaut delivers a terrific performance and owns this challenging character. The Rani of Jhansi has a lot of significance and the actress ensures she does complete justice to it. In the action scenes, she is great but watch out for her performances in the emotional sequences as well’’. The Economic Times gave the film a rating of 3.5/5 and wrote, ‘‘Manikarnika is a larger-than-life period drama doesn’t need a man to pack a punch’’. Praising Ranaut's performance they wrote, ‘‘Ranaut’s stellar screen presence brings Manikarnika to life. It highlights her prowess as a prolific actor and adds one more feather to her cap. Her transformation from a young girl to a warrior soaked in blood is effortless’’.

Ronak Kotecha of Times of India gave the film a rating of 3.5/5 and wrote, ‘‘Manikarnika is a well-made film that highlights Kangana’s prowess as an actor. For a first time filmmaker, she undoubtedly shows spark and potential as a storyteller. Short of an epic, this larger-than-life war drama has enough valour and spirit to keep you engaged in these pages of history’’ Praising Ranaut's performance he further wrote, ‘‘Kangana captivates your attention in every frame and grows from strength to strength as the film progresses. This is clearly one of her best performances and the role itself lends ample scope for her to perform; Kangana effortlessly brings Manikarnika to life’’. Devesh Sharma of Filmfare gave the film a rating of 3.5/5 and wrote, ‘‘Manikarnika manages to reintroduce one of the most awe-inspiring figures from India's past. A legend gets reborn, at least on screen, and maybe that's the only reality palatable to us right now’’. Praising Ranaut's performance he further wrote, ‘‘Kangana looks to the manor born playing Laxmibai. She channels the spirit of the warrior queen and is her fierce best in war scenes and also manages to give us the glimpse of the icon's soft side’’. Umesh Punwani of Koimoi gave the film a rating of 3.5/5 and wrote, ‘‘Manikarnika – The Queen of Jhansi is a visual form of our History chapters but a very intriguing and beautiful looking one. No one could have done this better than Kangana Ranaut and she is brutally bloody beautiful’’.

Lakshana N. Palat of India Today gave the film a rating of 3/5 and called Ranaut's performance in the film ‘‘excellent’’. She wrote, ‘‘If you're a Kangana Ranaut fan, Manikarnika is the film for you. If you remember your history lessons, take Manikarnika with a generous pinch of salt’’. Hannah Rachel Abraham of The Week gave the film a rating of 3/5 and wrote, ‘‘Ranaut certainly manages to don the role of our antar aatma ki aawaj, and has certainly made a praiseworthy effort in her directorial debut’’. Praising Ranaut's performance she further wrote, ‘‘Ranaut is undoubtedly magnificent as the titular character. She brings a righteous anger and otherworldly fury to the character. Ranaut plays Manikarnika with such conviction that one does not even pay attention to the weak script that makes her force-feed the audience with long expositions drowning is patriotic fervour’’. Mayank Shekhar of Mid-Day gave the film a rating of 3/5 and wrote, ‘‘Manikarnika is a big-budget, wholly star-driven, action-packed, period picture. Except the star is female, which is rare enough’’. Praising Ranaut her further wrote, ‘‘I can't imagine anybody as naturally earning that sobriquet as Kangana Ranaut. Dainty but fierce, Ranaut plays Rani Lakshmibai with the ferocity that suits her character best. She leads the charge not just as an actor, but also as director’’. Shubhra Gupta of The Indian Express gave the film a rating of 2.5/5 and wrote, ‘‘What keeps us with the film is Rani Ranaut, who in her best moments, owns her part, the single-track narrative, and the screen’’.

Overseas 
Anita Ayer of the Khaleej Times gave the film a rating of 3.5/5 and stated, ‘‘Manikarnika belongs to Kangana’’. Praising Ranaut's performance he further wrote, ‘‘Kangana does justice to the role by bringing to life the legendary war hero with her grit and fierce act. She also makes her debut as a co-director in this film, and you can feel her touch in the way Lakshmibai's personal life is portrayed’’. Rahul Aijaz of The Express Tribune gave the film a rating of 3.5/5 and wrote, ‘‘Manikarnika delivers on most fronts and proves an engaging affair from beginning to end. Ranaut appears in top form and even proves she can hang as a director’’. Praising Ranaut's performance he further wrote, ‘‘Manikarnika is a one-woman-show. Ranaut, in an avatar never seen before, displays a determination, fury and softness in her composure, body language, movement and expressions to bring the iconic rebel to life’’. Shilpa Jamkhandikar of Reuters wrote, ‘‘Kangana Ranaut does her best. She is awkward and stilted as the demure bride but comes into her own as the warrior queen. She adds a swagger to her stride and a steely determination to her demeanour that are hard not to cheer for. She is the only thing that make this film worth a watch’’. Ankur Pathak of HuffPost wrote, ‘‘Ranaut plays the titular role of Rani Laxmibai with conviction and brings a sense of ferocious energy to her character. The actress occupies nearly every frame of the movie and one cannot fault her performance; Ranaut is in fine form here. Her dialogue delivery has a sense of command and ownership which makes you root for her’’.

Box office 
The digital distribution rights for the film were acquired by Amazon Prime Video for 40 crore and the satellite rights were purchased at 25 crore. The distribution rights for theatre screening were purchased at 65 crore.
The movie opened with  7.75 crore in domestic market. On its second day, which coincided with Republic Day holiday, the film collected 18.10 crore. On its third day the movie remained steady and collected 15.50 crore, taking its opening weekend domestic collection to 41.35 crore, making it the highest weekend collection for a female-led movie. Its domestic nett collection in opening week was 61.15 crore. The domestic net of the film as per Bollywood Hungama is  92.19 crore and in the overseas market movie grossed  24.11 crore. The film initially performed well internationally and in India in its theatrical run; however, it was declared an average performer by Box Office India. It broke multiple box office records for female centric films such as the record for the highest single day earner ever for a female driven film in India previously held by Ranaut's own Tanu Weds Manu: Returns. and the highest first weekend collections for a female driven film in India. The film also became the highest Indian opener in Japan in January 2020. It is one of the highest grossing women centric films in India.

Awards and nominations

Sequel 
Kangana Ranaut and producer Kamal Jain have teamed up to work on a sequel titled Manikarnika Returns: The Legend of Didda. It would be based on Kashmiri female ruler Didda. Sources close to the development revealed that the new film will be bigger and mounted on an international scale, adding that the team intends to make a world class franchise of real life women heroes.

References

External links 
 
 Manikarnika: The Queen of Jhansi on Bollywood Hungama
 

2019 films
2010s Hindi-language films
Indian epic films
Indian historical drama films
Indian biographical drama films
History of India on film
Historical epic films
Indian swashbuckler films
Films about the Indian Rebellion of 1857
Films set in the Indian independence movement
Films set in the 1850s
British Empire war films
Films set in Uttar Pradesh
Films set in the British Raj
Films about women in India
Films directed by Krish
Films scored by Shankar–Ehsaan–Loy
Cultural depictions of Rani Laxmibai
Films set in the Maratha Empire
2019 biographical drama films
2019 directorial debut films
Cultural depictions of Indian monarchs
2019 drama films